The Liberation Front of Guinea (Portuguese: , FLG) was a political party in Guinea-Bissau, the part of Portuguese Guinea, formed to seek independence from Portugal.

It was created in 1961 from the union of the Liberation Movement of Guinea (MLG) headed by Francois Kankoila Mendy and the African Democratic Rally of Guinea (RDAG). On 3 August 1962 FLG merged in turn with six other parties to form the Struggle Front for the National Independence of Guinea (FLING)

References

Defunct political parties in Guinea-Bissau
Political parties established in 1961
Portuguese Guinea
Separatism in Portugal